Janice (Jan) Smithwick (born 6 August 1952) is a retired Australian women's basketball player.

Biography

Smithwick played for the Australia women's national basketball team during the late 1970s and early 1980s and competed for Australia at the 1979 World Championship held in South Korea. Smithwick also played for the Opals at the 1980 World Olympic Qualifying Tournament held in Bulgaria.

In the domestic Women's National Basketball League (WNBL), Smithwick played for the CYMS Comets (1981-82) and the Coburg Cougars (1983-85).

References

1952 births
Living people
Australian women's basketball players
People from Hamilton, Victoria